The Devil's Right Hand: An Introduction to Steve Earle is a compilation album by Steve Earle. The album was released on May 8, 2001.

Track listing
All songs written by Steve Earle unless otherwise noted.
"My Old Friend the Blues" - 3:10
"Fearless Heart" - 4:08
"Little Rock 'n' Roller" - 4:51
"Someday" - 3:49
"Little Sister" - 3:16 (Greg Trooper)
"Sweet Little '66" - 2:40
"San Antonio Girl" - 3:06
"The Rain Came Down" - 4:09 (Steve Earle, Michael Woody)
"The Devil's Right Hand" - 3:01
"Even When I'm Blue" - 4:14
"You Belong to Me" - 4:23
"The Other Kind" - 5:32
"Hopeless Romantics" - 2:45
"Billy Austin" - 6:16
"Regular Guy" - 3:18
"Close Your Eyes" - 4:45
"She's About a Mover" (live) - 4:10 (Doug Sahm)
"Dead Flowers" (live) - 8:18 (Mick Jagger, Keith Richards)

References

Steve Earle compilation albums
2001 compilation albums